The 2015 Belk Bowl a college football bowl game that was played on December 30, 2015 at Bank of America Stadium in Charlotte, North Carolina in the United States.  The fourteenth annual Belk Bowl, it matched the NC State Wolfpack and the Mississippi State Bulldogs.  The game started at approximately 3:30 p.m. ET and was nationally televised by ESPN.  It was one of the 2015–16 bowl games that concluded the 2015 season.  It was sponsored by Charlotte-based department store Belk.

Game summary

Scoring summary

Source:

Statistics

References

Belk Bowl
Duke's Mayo Bowl
Mississippi State Bulldogs football bowl games
NC State Wolfpack football bowl games
Belk Bowl